Herbert Huber (4 December 1944 - 15 July 1970) was an Austrian alpine skier and Olympic medalist. He received a silver medal in the slalom at the 1968 Winter Olympics in Grenoble.

Death
Huber, who had a history of depression, committed suicide in 1970 in Kitzbühel.

References

External links
 
 

Olympic alpine skiers of Austria
Austrian male alpine skiers
Alpine skiers at the 1968 Winter Olympics
Olympic silver medalists for Austria
1944 births
1970 suicides
Sportspeople from Tyrol (state)
Olympic medalists in alpine skiing
Medalists at the 1968 Winter Olympics
People from Kitzbühel
20th-century Austrian people